Pedro Piedrabuena (born August 21, 1971 in Montevideo) is a Uruguayan-born American professional three-cushion billiards player. He now resides in San Diego, California.

Professional career
After Sang Lee's record 12 consecutive USBA National Three-Cushion Championships from 1990 to 2001, it was Piedrabuena who next took the title, in 2002. After his win in 2002 Piedrabuena went on to win 11 USBA National Three-Cushion Championships, with his most recent win in 2022.

Prior to his move to the United States, Piedrabuena won two Uruguayan titles. His highest  is 26.

References

American carom billiards players
Sportspeople from San Diego
People from Montevideo
Uruguayan expatriate sportspeople in the United States
Uruguayan people of Spanish descent
1971 births
Living people
Competitors at the 2022 World Games